Astathes terminata is a species of beetle in the family Cerambycidae. It was described by Pascoe in 1857. It is known from Malaysia, Borneo, Java and Sumatra.

References

T
Beetles described in 1857